Jacqueline Petr (born October 9, 1970 in Winnipeg, Manitoba) is a Canadian retired ice dancer. With partner Mark Janoschak, she is the 1992 Canadian national champion. They represented Canada at the 1992 Winter Olympics, where they placed 12th.

Career 
A few months after she and Mark Janoschak teamed up, they placed 7th at the 1987 World Junior Championships.

Two years later, Petr and Janoschak placed 6th at the Canadian Championships. The following year, they won the bronze medal. In 1991, they won the silver medal and qualified for the 1991 World Championships, where they placed 10th.

In 1992, Petr and Janoschak won their national title and were selected for the 1992 Winter Olympics. During a practice session on February 10, Petr's right skate hit her left calf, requiring 22 stitches. They finished 12th at the Olympics. At the 1992 World Championships, they placed 12th.

Petr and Janoschak retired from competitive skating and skated professionally in shows.

She later coached and was married to Joseph Mero until an affair with a student led to her being banned by the USFSA.

Results
(with Mark Janoschak)

References

External links 
 
 

1970 births
Canadian female ice dancers
Figure skaters at the 1992 Winter Olympics
Living people
Olympic figure skaters of Canada
Sportspeople from Winnipeg
Competitors at the 1990 Goodwill Games